Westgrove may refer to:

 Westgrove, Queensland, a locality in the Maranoa Region, Queensland, Australia
 West Grove (Cardiff), a road in Roath, Cardiff, Wales